HMS Galatea was an  fifth rate of the Royal Navy. The frigate was built at Deptford Dockyard, London, England and launched on 31 August 1810. In 1811 she participated in the Battle of Tamatave, which battle confirmed British dominance of the seas east of the Cape of Good Hope for the rest of the Napoleonic Wars. She was hulked in 1836 and broken up in 1849.

Napoleonic Wars
Galatea was commissioned in September 1810 under Captain Woodley Losack, who would remain her captain until 1815. He sailed her to the Cape of Good Hope on 31 December 1810.

On 6 May 1811, a French squadron of frigates under the command of Commodore François Roquebert in Renommée approached Grand Port, not realizing that Isle de France (now Mauritius) had fallen to the British.

On 14 May Astraea, Phoebe, Galatea, and Racehorse sailed from Port Louis for Tamatave, Madagascar and arrived on the 20th. The British squadron sighted the French squadron and made chase. A severe engagement, the Battle of Tamatave, ensued. During the battle, Renommée and Clorinde badly battered Galatea, with the result that she lost 16 men killed and 46 wounded – the largest number of casualties of any vessel in the squadron.  In 1847 the Admiralty authorized the award of the Naval General Service Medal with clasp "Off Tamatave 20 May 1811" to all surviving claimants from the action.

The British captured Renommée. Roquebert had sacrificed his flagship and ultimately his life to allow Clorinde and the badly damaged Néréide to escape. Five days later, Schomberg's squadron rediscovered Néréide at Tamatave. The British persuaded the town's commander to surrender the town, and Néréide, without any further fight.

The battle was the last action of the Mauritius campaign. Thereafter Galatea served primarily, and relatively uneventfully, as a convoy escort for the rest of war.

Galatea participated in the War of 1812.

Frederick separated from the other three ships on 27 October, off Ascension. They gave chase and Congress captured Argo, but Galatea escaped and arrived at Portsmouth.

Galatea was in company with  when they recaptured the brig Fermina on 18 April 1813. On 1 June 1813 she sailed for Lisbon.

Post-war
In October 1815 Galatea was laid up at Portsmouth. She underwent £36,187 in expenses for repairs and fitting for sea at Deptford from late 1819 to February 1826.

In August 1825 Captain Sir Charles Sullivan recommissioned Galatea and then went on to command her on the coasts of Portugal and South America until 1829. From 8 January 1829 to 28 January 1832 her commander was Captain Charles Napier who, in a letter written shortly after his appointment, described her as "a ship that has the worst reputation in the Navy".

Between January and May 1829, Napier fitted her with an experimental system of his own design of paddles that the crew would work via winches on the main deck. The paddles proved useful for manoeuvering at speeds of up to 3 knots in windless conditions. On 12 September 1831 Galatea towed the line-of-battle ship  by means of paddles alone. Between December 1829 and February 1830 she underwent a refit that cost £12,595.

Twice during this period she cruised to the Caribbean, calling at Jamaica, Havana, Cuba and Tampico, Mexico. Between August and October 1830 she was sent to Lisbon to demand the restitution of British merchantmen which had been seized by the government of the Portuguese usurper Dom Miguel, and in May–July 1831 she was engaged in guarding British interests in the Azores when the forces of Dom Pedro were engaged in recovering those islands for the rightful queen, Donna Maria II. Napier quit Galatea in 1832 after she was paid off and succeeded George Sartorius as commander of Dom Pedro's navy in February 1833.

Fate
Between August and September 1836, Galatea was at Plymouth being fitted as a receiving ship and a coal depot for Jamaica. She was then moved to Jamaica in 1840. She was broken up there in 1849 following an Admiralty order dated 24 September 1849.

Notes, citations, and references
Notes

Citations

References

External links
 

Ships built in Deptford
1810 ships
Apollo-class frigates
Fifth-rate frigates of the Royal Navy
Coal hulks
War of 1812 ships of the United Kingdom